Charles Samuel Hughes (October 13, 1906 – March 24, 1981) was an American baseball second baseman and shortstop in the Negro leagues. He played with several clubs from 1931 to 1938.

References

External links
 and Baseball-Reference Black Baseball stats and Seamheads

Baltimore Black Sox players
Columbus Blue Birds players
Cleveland Red Sox players
Homestead Grays players
Pittsburgh Crawfords players
Washington Black Senators players
1906 births
1981 deaths
Baseball players from Pennsylvania
Baseball shortstops
20th-century African-American sportspeople